The Wisconsin Law Review is a bimonthly law review published by students at the University of Wisconsin Law School. One issue each year is generally dedicated to a symposium or special topic.

History 
The Wisconsin Law Review was established in 1920 by students and faculty of the law school. The first issue was published in October 1920. In 1935, the journal became entirely student-edited.  The first faculty Editor-in-Chief of the Law Review was "legendary" law professor William Herbert ("Herbie") Page, who taught at the school from 1917 until his death in 1952.  The first student Editor-in-Chief was Leon Foley. In 1940, Harriet Zetterberg became the journal's first female Editor-in-Chief.

Admissions 
Students are awarded staff membership based solely on their performance in a write-on competition at the end of their first year of law school, which consists of a Note, Bluebook exercise, and Diversity Statement. The journal no longer takes first-year grades into consideration.

References

External links 
 

American law journals
University of Wisconsin–Madison academic journals
Bimonthly journals
English-language journals
Publications established in 1920
Law journals edited by students
General law journals
University of Wisconsin Law School
1920 establishments in Wisconsin